Campae or Kampai was a town of ancient Cappadocia, inhabited during Roman and Byzantine times. In the Tabula Peutingeriana it is listed as Cambe and positioned 16 M.P. north or northwest from Mazaca.

Its site is tentatively located near Boğazköprü, Asiatic Turkey.

References

Populated places in ancient Cappadocia
Former populated places in Turkey
Populated places of the Byzantine Empire
Roman towns and cities in Turkey
History of Kayseri Province